Qeran Chay Kandi (also Romanized as Qerān Chāy Kandī; also known as Ghāzān Chāy Kandī, Gherān, and Gherān Chāy Kandī) is a village in Mulan Rural District, in the Central District of Kaleybar County, East Azerbaijan Province, Iran. At the 2006 census, its population was 112, in 27 families.

References 

Populated places in Kaleybar County